George Francis Peduzzi (June 13, 1897 – July 23, 1947), known professionally as Karyl Norman, was an American female impersonator who was popular in vaudeville, nightclubs and on Broadway in the 1920s.

Biography
He was born in Baltimore, Maryland on June 13, 1897 to Mary and Norman Augusta Peduzzi.  He left home at the age of 16, joined Neil O'Brien's Minstrels, and began performing vaudeville on the US West Coast.  In 1917, he traveled to Australia as a theatrical performer.  He took the name Karyl because it was sexless, and Norman after his father.

He billed himself as "The Creole Fashion Plate", and was known for his gowns, mostly made by his mother with whom he traveled.  He made his New York City debut as a female impersonator in May 1919 and was an immediate success. He specialised in Southern songs, and was known for his quick changes of clothes and gender.  One critic wrote: "Not only does this impersonator wear his feminine toggery in tiptop shape, but has a voice that fools 'em at the start. Then to a lower register he descends - a lusty masculine voice....".  He wrote many of his own songs, including "Nobody Lied (When They Said That I Cried Over You)", "Beside a Babbling Brook", and "I’m Through (Shedding Tears Over You)".

As well as performing in vaudeville, Norman appeared in many stage plays and musical comedies.  He also toured in Britain, Europe, Australia, New Zealand, and South Africa. In New York, he appeared in the Palace Theatre on Broadway in 1923, starred in the Greenwich Village Follies of 1924, and Lady Do in 1927, and headlined at the Palace Theatre in 1930 in an act called "Glorifying the American Boy-Girl".  With Gene Malin, Ray Bourbon and others he instigated the "Pansy Craze" for drag acts in New York in 1930.  The actress Fifi D'Orsay described Norman as "...a great performer... a wonderful guy, beloved and respected by everybody, although he was a gay boy... it was harder for them than it is today.  He did an act with two pianos and those gorgeous clothes.  He had such class and he was so divine.".

In the 1930s, his popularity diminished but he continued to perform in clubs, particularly at Finocchio's in San Francisco.  He was reportedly arrested on a morals charge in Detroit, but was released after the intervention of Eleanor Roosevelt.  In 1942 he put on his All American Male Revue, starring Niles Marsh, at the Castle Farms Night Club in Lima, Ohio.

He retired after his mother's death.  He died in Hollywood, Florida, in 1947 at the age of 50.

See also
Julian Eltinge
Bothwell Browne
Bert Savoy

References

1897 births
1947 deaths
People from Baltimore
American drag queens
Gay entertainers
Blackface minstrel performers
20th-century American male singers
20th-century American singers
20th-century LGBT people